"You Little Beauty" is a song by Australian producer Fisher, released as a single on 10 May 2019 through Catch & Release and Etcetc. The song samples the vocals of late disco and house legend Loleatta Holloway's song "Love Sensation". It became Fisher's second consecutive number one on the ARIA Club Tracks chart.

At the ARIA Music Awards of 2019, the song was nominated for ARIA Award for Best Dance Release.

Background
Upon release Fisher told Zane Lowe on Beats 1: "The vocal itself is so amazing. All I wanted to do was just put my Fisher charm to it really, and I just wanted to make a big old bassline, put some hats and a good old kick, and away we went." Fisher added: "'You Little Beauty' is basically what we always say on Gold Coast is when everyone's going mad, or having fun, or doing something goofy - you just say 'you little beauty'. I basically just made that song and I thought, what can I call it? and I thought, 'You Little Beauty.'"

Charts

Weekly charts

Year-end charts

References

2019 singles
2019 songs
Fisher (musician) songs
House music songs
Capitol Records singles
Songs written by Dan Hartman